Tommy Tucker's Tooth is a live-action short film by Walt Disney at his short-lived Laugh-O-Grams studio in Kansas City from 1922. The format was black and white, and without sound.

The film was one of two commissioned by Kansas City Dentist Thomas B. McCrum. It earned the Laugh-O-Gram studio $500. It extols the virtue of regular tooth brushing through the story of two boys: Tommy Tucker and Jimmie Jones. Tommy cares for his teeth, while Jimmie does not. The film ends with advice on proper tooth-brushing technique.

In 1926 Disney made the follow up short Clara Cleans Her Teeth, starring Walt's niece Marjorie Sewell Davis, after being contacted by McCrum again, who asked for a sequel.

References

External links
 
 
 Tommy Tucker's Tooth at The Encyclopedia of Disney Animated Shorts

1920s Disney animated short films
1920s American animated films
Films about dentistry
Films directed by Walt Disney
Films produced by Walt Disney
1922 animated films
1922 films
Articles containing video clips
American black-and-white films
Laugh-O-Gram Studio films
1922 short films